Love & Hate is a studio album by American rapper Aceyalone. It was released on Project Blowed and Decon in 2003. It peaked at number 50 on the Billboard Heatseekers Albums chart, as well as number 31 on the Independent Albums chart.

Critical reception
At Metacritic, which assigns a weighted average score out of 100 to reviews from mainstream critics, Love & Hate received an average score of 66% based on 9 reviews, indicating "generally favorable reviews".

John Bush of AllMusic gave the album 4.5 stars out of 5, saying, "[Aceyalone's] rhymes are among the best of his career, and he covers a lot of ground over 15 cuts; nearly every time he makes a record, he makes it clear that rap music has so much possibility that's never dreamed of by most on a major label."

Track listing

Charts

References

External links
 

2003 albums
Aceyalone albums
Decon albums
Albums produced by El-P
Albums produced by RJD2